Nicholas C. Ragus (1908 – April 12, 1981) was an American football and basketball coach. He served as the head football coach at Arizona State Teachers College at Flagstaff—now known as Northern Arizona University—from 1947 to 1948, compiling a record of 5–12. Ragus was also the school's head basketball coach from 1947 to 1949, tallying a mark of 24–18. He previously served as a head coach at a number of high schools in Arizona, including Miami High School in Miami, Arizona.

Ragus played college football at Saint Mary's College of California.

Head coaching record

Football

References

1908 births
1981 deaths
Basketball coaches from Arizona
Northern Arizona Lumberjacks football coaches
Northern Arizona Lumberjacks men's basketball coaches
Saint Mary's Gaels football players
High school football coaches in Arizona
People from Globe, Arizona
Players of American football from Arizona